The Capellades Paper Mill Museum is a museum about paper located in the town of Capellades. The museum is located in an old paper mill called the Molí de la Vila. It is one of the most important museums in the world on the subject of papermaking. Its collection is based on a series of traditional papermaking machines and papers and documents from the 13th century. It is part of the Science and Technology Museum of Catalonia.

Exhibition

The main exhibition tells the history of paper, from the most traditional system to the printing technologies of the 21st century. In the basement, where paper is still made by hand, visitors can observe the artistry behind the paper making process.

References

External links

 Official site

Barcelona Provincial Council Local Museum Network
Anoia
Papermaking museums
Industry museums in Catalonia
Media museums